Ichabod Chaunc(e)y,  (1635–1691) was an English physician and nonconformist divine. He was an army chaplain at Dunkirk before 1660, beneficed in Bristol, ejected from his living for nonconformity in 1662, and practised medicine at Bristol from 1662 to 1684. He was banished from England for nonconformity and other offences in 1684, and returned to Bristol in 1686.

Origins 
Ichabod Chauncey was born at the vicarage at Ware, Hertfordshire, the second son of Charles Chauncy (1592–1672), the Puritan minister of Ware, by his wife Catherine,  (1604–). Charles was suspended for his opposition to Laudianism and in 1638 emigrated with his family to colonial New England, where he became a minister and president of Harvard College.

Rise and fall 
Ichabod graduated B.A. from Harvard in 1651 and proceeded M.A. in 1654 before returning to England. He was chaplain to Sir Edward Harley's regiment at Dunkirk at the time the Uniformity Act was passed. Shortly afterwards he obtained a living in Bristol, and, being ejected for nonconformity, practised physic there for eighteen years, and obtained a considerable practice. In his Innocence vindicated he states that in 1684 he was a M.A. of thirty years' standing, and for twenty had been a licentiate of the London College of Physicians.

In 1682 he was prosecuted for not attending church and other religious offences under the Religion Act 1592 (35 Eliz. I, c. 1). His defence was that he accommodated his worship as nearly as he could to that of the primitive church, but he was convicted and fined. In 1684 he was again prosecuted under the same act, and was imprisoned in the common gaol for eighteen weeks before he was tried, when he was sentenced to lose his estate both real and personal, and to leave the realm within three months. From a declaration drawn up by the grand jury, he appears to have been in the habit of defending such dissenters in Bristol as were prosecuted under the various acts relating to religion; but from the Records of the Broadmead Meeting, Bristol, his persecution appears to have originated in the private malice of the town clerk.

Later life and death 
Chauncey resided in Holland, where he studied medicine at Leiden and ministered to a congregation, until 1686, when a pardon allowed him to return to Bristol. There he died on 25 July 1691 and was interred on 27 July in St Philip's churchyard. His wife, Mary, and three sons—Staunton, Charles, and Nathaniel (1679–1750)—survived him; the second son was the father of Charles Chauncey, a physician; the third son served an Independent congregation at Devizes, Wiltshire, for nearly fifty years.

Works 
His only work is Innocence vindicated by a Narrative of the Proceedings of the Court of Sessions in Bristol against I. C., Physician, to his Conviction on the Statute of the 36th Elizabeth, 1684. This was printed in Holland during his exile there, and provided a defence of his actions in England.

References

Sources 

 
 Chauncy, Ichabod (1684). Innocence vindicated by a brief and impartial narrative of the proceedings of the Court of Sessions in Bristol against Ichabod Chauncy, physitian in that city, to his conviction on the statute of the 35th Eliz. on the 9th of April, and to his abjuration of all the Kings dominions for ever, Aug. 15, 1684: together with some passages subsequent thereunto / published by the said I. Chavncy. London: George Larkin. pp. 1–15.

Attribution:

Further reading 

 Calamy, Edmund; Palmer, Samuel (1803). The Nonconformist's Memorial. Vol. 3. London: J. Cundee. p. 178.
 Griffiths, Olive M. (1935). Religion and Learning: A Study in English Presbyterian Thought from the Bartholomew Ejections (1662) to the Foundation of the Unitarian Movement. Cambridge: Cambridge University Press. p. 24.
 Munk, William (1878). The Roll of the Royal College of Physicians of London. Vol. 1: 1518 to 1700. London: Harrison and Sons. pp. 354–355.
 Waters, Henry F. (1885). "Genealogical Gleanings in England". The New England Historical and Genealogical Register, Vol. 39. Boston. p. 167.
 "Ichabod Chauncey". Royal College of Physicians Museum. 2019. Retrieved 21 October 2022.

1691 deaths
17th-century English Puritans
17th-century English writers
1635 births
Harvard College alumni
17th-century English medical doctors
People from Ware, Hertfordshire
Licentiates of the Royal College of Physicians
Medical doctors from Bristol
English Dissenters